Josip Despot (8 July 1953 – 21 August 2017) was a Croatian rower. He competed in the men's eight event at the 1972 Summer Olympics.

References

1953 births
2017 deaths
Croatian male rowers
Olympic rowers of Yugoslavia
Rowers at the 1972 Summer Olympics
Sportspeople from Šibenik